Shish kofta (Turkish) is a type of kebab-style kofta dish in Turkish cuisine.

The dish consists of minced lamb, mutton, veal or beef, or a mixture of these meats mixed with herbs, often including parsley and mint, placed on a şiş (skewer) and grilled. It is typically served with pilav (Turkish-style rice or bulgur wheat) and salad.

There are several regional variations on shish kofta. Tire köfte is made mainly with veal.

The city of Burdur is known for its distinct variant of shish kofta known as Burdur şiş, which is traditionally made with minced goat meat (or more commonly with beef today), with salt but no spices or herbs, and eaten with special type of pita bread. Burdur şiş was officially recognised as a distinct variant of shish kofta by the Turkish Patent and Trademark Office in 2010.

Shish kofta is also the basis of yoğurtlu kebap (kebab with yogurt).

See also  
 Ćevapi
 Burdur Şiş
 Kebab
 List of kebabs
 Şiş kebap
 Lula kebab
 Kabab koobideh

References

Skewered kebabs
Kofta
Barbecue
Middle Eastern grilled meats
Turkish cuisine
Persian words and phrases
Turkish words and phrases
Azerbaijani cuisine
Iranian cuisine